Chalab is a village in Kurdistan Province, Iran.

Chalab or Chal Ab may also refer to:

Jradzor, Armenia
Chalab-e Bekr, Iran
Chalab-e Olya, Iran
Chalab-e Olya, Kermanshah, Iran
Chalab-e Pain, Iran
Chalab-e Sofla, Iran
Chalab-e Sofla, Kermanshah, Iran
Chal Ab Morad Ali, Iran